Coz I Luv You is a compilation album by the British rock band Slade. It was released in 1972 in certain European countries, Australia and Argentina. It was the band's first compilation album and reached No. 10 in the Netherlands.

Capitalising on the success of the band's 1971 commercial breakthrough with the singles "Get Down and Get with It", "Coz I Luv You" and "Look Wot You Dun", the compilation was quickly compiled and released by Polydor. Aside from the A-Sides, the compilation features a mix of B-Sides and album tracks from the band's 1970 album Play It Loud.

Release
"Coz I Luv You" was released by Polydor in Germany, the Netherlands, Norway, Sweden, Argentina and Australia. In Argentina, it was released under the name Mira Lo Que Has Hecho, which translates to "Look What You Have Done". In the Netherlands, the compilation had a different track-listing to the other releases. It replaced "Angelina", "Candidate", "Look Wot You Dun" and "Could I" with "One Way Hotel", "Do You Want Me", "See Us Here" and "Know Who You Are".

In 1973, it was re-issued in Germany by Luxor Gold. It too had a revised track-listing, featuring "See Us Here", "One Way Hotel", "I Remember", "Pouk Hill" and "Dirty Joker" in place of "My Life is Natural", "Candidate", "Could I", "Gospel According to Rasputin" and "Get Down and Get with It". Another German re-issue followed in 1974, released by Karussell, but featuring the original 1972 track-listing. The compilation is now out-of-print and has never been released on CD.

Track listing

Dutch edition

1973 German edition

Critical reception

In a retrospective review of the album, Dave Thompson of AllMusic stated: "...in truth, there was little for the compilers to work with beyond adding the A- and B-sides of the band's last three singles to half-a-dozen tracks culled from Play It Loud itself. But still it's a terrific compilation, with the album cuts certainly consistent with the majesty of the hits. Indeed, of all the myriad Slade compilations to have appeared over the decades since then, this - the earliest of them all - feels closer to a "real" album than any of them."

Chart performance

Personnel
Slade
Noddy Holder – lead vocals, rhythm guitar
Dave Hill – lead guitar, backing vocals
Jim Lea – bass, piano, violin, backing vocals
Don Powell – drums

Additional personnel
Chas Chandler - producer

References

1972 compilation albums
Slade compilation albums
Polydor Records compilation albums